Mazetown or Maze (possibly , otherwise known as an Mhaigh meaning "the plain") is a small village in County Down, Northern Ireland. It was named after the townland of Maze. The village and townland sit on the southern bank of the River Lagan, which separates it from Lurganure. This river is also the boundary between County Down and County Antrim.

It is within the Lisburn City Council area, and the Maze electoral ward. In the 2001 Census, there were 363 residents.

Places of interest
Maze is the site of HM Prison Maze, formerly a RAF station at Long Kesh. The prison was the main internment centre in Northern Ireland for suspected terrorists during the 1970s and was the focus of the 1981 Irish Hunger Strike. It closed in 2000. The site is to be redeveloped and there are plans to provide a new national stadium for Northern Ireland (which would be unpopular with some) and an equestrian facility. Proposals to retain some of the former prison buildings have also provoked controversy .

See also
Maze (electoral ward)
List of towns and villages in Northern Ireland

External links 
Priesthill (Zion) Methodist

Villages in County Down